Oliver Jones (born 6 February 2003) is an Australian professional footballer who plays as a midfielder for Macarthur FC. He made his professional debut on 8 December 2021 in a FFA Cup match against A-League Men side Sydney FC.

References

External links

2003 births
Living people
Australian soccer players
Association football midfielders
Macarthur FC players
National Premier Leagues players